The 1976–77 Bundesliga was the 14th season of the Bundesliga, West Germany's premier football league. It began on 14 August 1976 and ended on 21 May 1977. Borussia Mönchengladbach were the defending champions.

Competition modus
Every team played two games against each other team, one at home and one away. Teams received two points for a win and one point for a draw. If two or more teams were tied on points, places were determined by goal difference and, if still tied, by goals scored. The team with the most points were crowned champions while the three teams with the fewest points were relegated to their respective 2. Bundesliga divisions.

Team changes to 1975–76
Hannover 96, Kickers Offenbach and Bayer 05 Uerdingen were relegated to the 2. Bundesliga after finishing in the last three places. They were replaced by Tennis Borussia Berlin, winners of the 2. Bundesliga Northern Division, 1. FC Saarbrücken, winners of the Southern Division and Borussia Dortmund, who won a two-legged promotion play-off against 1. FC Nürnberg.

Season overview

Team overview

League table

Results

Top goalscorers
34 goals
  Dieter Müller (1. FC Köln)

28 goals
  Gerd Müller (FC Bayern Munich)

26 goals
  Bernd Hölzenbein (Eintracht Frankfurt)

24 goals
  Klaus Fischer (FC Schalke 04)
  Wolfgang Frank (Eintracht Braunschweig)

21 goals
  Josef Kaczor (VfL Bochum)

20 goals
  Horst Hrubesch (Rot-Weiß Essen)
  Benny Wendt (Tennis Borussia Berlin)
  Rüdiger Wenzel (Eintracht Frankfurt)

19 goals
  Klaus Toppmöller (1. FC Kaiserslautern)

Champion squad

See also
 1976–77 DFB-Pokal

References

External links
 DFB Bundesliga archive 1976/1977

Bundesliga seasons
1
Germany